Ferdman is a surname. Notable people with the surname include:

Jeremy Ferdman (born 1986), Canadian actor
Tatiana Ferdman (born 1957), Russian table tennis player

See also
Feldman